Zdravko Radulović (born December 12, 1966) is a former professional basketball player, who is now a coach. 

Radulović was born in Nikšić, SR Montenegro, SFR Yugoslavia. At a height of 1.91 m (6'3") tall, he played at the shooting guard position.

Club career
Radulović was a very prolific scorer, being the FIBA EuroLeague Top Scorer during the 1992–93 season, with an average of 23.9 points per game.

Yugoslav national team
Radulović was a member of the senior men's Yugoslav national team. With Yugoslavia, he won the silver medal at the 1988 Summer Olympic Games, and the gold medal at the 1989 EuroBasket.

Coaching career
Radulović was the head coach of the Croatian club team Cedevita, in November 2007. He followed that up by coaching Zagreb, and then Cibona.

References and notes

External links
FIBA.com Profile

1966 births
Living people
Aris B.C. players
Croatian men's basketball players
Yugoslav men's basketball players
Israeli Basketball Premier League players
KK Cibona players
KK Cedevita coaches
KK Zrinjevac players
Maccabi Tel Aviv B.C. players
Olympic silver medalists for Yugoslavia
Olympic basketball players of Yugoslavia
Basketball players at the 1988 Summer Olympics
Shooting guards
FIBA EuroBasket-winning players
Sportspeople from Nikšić
Olympic medalists in basketball
Medalists at the 1988 Summer Olympics
Universiade medalists in basketball
Universiade gold medalists for Yugoslavia
Medalists at the 1987 Summer Universiade
KK Bosna Royal players
Traiskirchen Lions players